The men's two handed discus throw was a track and field athletics event held as part of the Athletics at the 1912 Summer Olympics programme.  It was the only appearance of the event at the Olympics, along with the other two handed throws.  The format of the event was such that each thrower threw the discus three times with his right hand and three times with his left hand.  The best distance with each hand was summed to give a total.  The three finalists received three more throws with each hand. The competition was held on Saturday, July 13, 1912. Twenty discus throwers from six nations competed. NOCs could enter up to 12 athletes.

Results

Taipale, who had won the standard discus throw, also won the two-handed event.

References

Sources
 
 

Athletics at the 1912 Summer Olympics
Discus throw at the Olympics